Papyrus 9 (in the Gregory-Aland numbering), signed by 𝔓9, and named Oxyrhynchus papyri 402, is an early copy of the New Testament in Greek. It is a papyrus manuscript of the First Epistle of John, dating paleographically to the early 3rd century.

Description 

Papyrus 𝔓9 was discovered by Bernard Pyne Grenfell and Arthur Surridge Hunt in Oxyrhynchus, Egypt. Papyrus 𝔓9 is currently housed at the Houghton Library, Harvard University, Semitic Museum Inv. 3736, Cambridge (Massachusetts). 

The surviving text is a fragment of one leaf containing verses 4:11-12,14-17, written in one column per page. The original codex had 16 lines per page. The text on the manuscript was written very carelessly, evidenced by the crude and irregular handwriting, and the manuscript contains some unintelligible spellings.

Text 
The Greek text of this codex is representative of the Alexandrian text-type. Aland placed it in Category I. The manuscript is too brief for certainty.

See also 
 1 John 4
 List of New Testament papyri
 Oxyrhynchus papyri
 Papyrus 10
 Papyrus Oxyrhynchus 401
 Papyrus Oxyrhynchus 403

References

Further reading 
 
 

New Testament papyri
402
3rd-century biblical manuscripts
Early Greek manuscripts of the New Testament
First Epistle of John papyri